Markus Puolakka (born 6 May 1985) is a Finnish speed skater. He competed in the men's 500 metres event at the 2010 Winter Olympics.

References

External links
 

1985 births
Living people
Finnish male speed skaters
Olympic speed skaters of Finland
Speed skaters at the 2010 Winter Olympics
People from Pieksämäki
Sportspeople from South Savo